USS Pembina was a  built for the Union Navy during the American Civil War.  She was used by the Navy to patrol navigable waterways of the Confederacy to prevent the South from trading with other countries.

Service 

Pembina, a screw gunboat built by Thomas Stack and Novelty Iron Works, New York City, was commissioned 16 October 1861.

By 5 November, she had joined the South Atlantic Blockading Squadron and with Ottawa, Seneca, and Pawnee engaged and dispersed a small Confederate squadron in Port Royal Sound, then fired on Fort Beauregard and Fort Walker. Returning with a larger force on 7 November, she fired on Fort Walker until it was abandoned. Then, on 9 November, she covered the occupation of Beaufort, South Carolina.
 
In early December, she penetrated into Wassaw Sound to assist in closing off Savannah, Georgia. By the end of the month, she had engaged Confederate positions at Port Royal Ferry and into January 1862 assisted in clearing the Coosaw River. Between 17 January and 18 February, she operated in the Wright’s and Mud rivers area, clearing mines from the Savannah River above the mouth of Wright’s River between 13–15 February.
 
Continuing to cruise off the Georgia and northern Florida coasts she escorted transports and covered troops as they assaulted Confederate positions and, on 9 April, as they evacuated Jacksonville, Florida. In May, she shifted to the Carolina coast for operations in the Stono River, where on 6 June seized her first prize, the schooner Rowena.
 
Later shifted to the U.S. Gulf Coast, she captured a second vessel, the sloop Elias Beckwith, near Mobile, Alabama, 23 April 1863. Remaining on the Gulf Coast, she seized her third and last blockade runner, the Dutch brig Geziena Hilligonda, carrying medicines, iron and cloth, off Brazos Santiago, Texas, on 4 December 1864.

After the war, she returned to the U.S. East Coast. Decommissioned at the Washington Navy Yard on 22 September 1865, she was sold at New York City on 30 November 1865.

References 

 

Ships of the Union Navy
Ships built in New York City
Steamships of the United States Navy
Unadilla-class gunboats
American Civil War patrol vessels of the United States
1861 ships